Vida V. de Voss is a Namibian feminist activist, the director of the Namibian feminist organisation Sister Namibia, and a lecturer in English literature at the Namibia University of Science and Technology.

Education
De Voss earned a master's degree in philosophy from Stellenbosch University in 2006, and her master's thesis was entitled,  Emmanuel Levinas on ethics as the first truth. In 2010, she earned a master's degree in English literature from Iowa State University, and her thesis was entitled The Identity Challenge in Toni Morrison's "Paradise" .

Career
De Voss has been a lecturer in English literature at the Namibia University of Science and Technology since 2013.

De Voss is the director of Sister Namibia, a feminist organisation and publisher of an eponymous magazine (first published in 1989), based in Windhoek.
De Voss has also been a guest speaker at the University of Namibia in Windhoek. In March 2016, she spoke to an audience of hundreds of women at a conference at Windhoek's Safari Court Hotel to commemorate International Women's Day.

References

Living people
Iowa State University alumni
Stellenbosch University alumni
Academic staff of the Namibia University of Science and Technology
Namibian feminists
21st-century Namibian people
21st-century Namibian women
Year of birth missing (living people)